Love and How to Cure It is a 1937 British comedy film directed by Royston Morley, based on a story by Thornton Wilder and starring Sara Gregory, Louise Hampton, Edward Chapman and Athene Seyler. It was made by the BBC for television, but also shown in cinemas as well.

References

External links

1937 films
1937 comedy films
British comedy films
British black-and-white films
1930s English-language films
1930s British films